Cheilophyllum is a genus of flowering plants belonging to the family Plantaginaceae.

Its native range is Caribbean.

Species:

Cheilophyllum dentatum 
Cheilophyllum jamaicense 
Cheilophyllum macranthum 
Cheilophyllum marginatum 
Cheilophyllum micranthum 
Cheilophyllum microphyllum 
Cheilophyllum radicans 
Cheilophyllum sphaerocarpum

References

Plantaginaceae
Plantaginaceae genera